Perotrochus lucaya, common name the Lucayan slit shell, is a species of large sea snail, a marine gastropod mollusk in the family Pleurotomariidae, the slit snails.

Description
The length of the shell varies between 25 mm and 60 mm.

Distribution
This species occurs in the Caribbean Sea off Venezuela and in the Atlantic Ocean off the Bahamas at depths between 275 m and 427 m.

References

External links
 To Encyclopedia of Life
 To GenBank (2 nucleotides; 0 proteins)
 To USNM Invertebrate Zoology Mollusca Collection
 To ITIS
 To World Register of Marine Species
 

Pleurotomariidae
Gastropods described in 1965